Oleksandr Shevelyukhin (born 27 August 1982) is a Ukrainian professional football manager and former player who played as a defender.

Career
He moved to FC Illichivets Mariupol from Kryvbas Kryvyi Rih during the start of the 2007–08 transfer season. Shevelyukhin is the product of Dynamo Kyiv Youth School system.

External links
 
 Profile on Official Illychivets Website
 Profile on EUFO
 Profile on Football Squads
 

1982 births
Living people
People from Kozyn
Ukrainian footballers
FC Mariupol players
FC Dynamo-2 Kyiv players
FC Dynamo-3 Kyiv players
FC CSKA Kyiv players
FC Kryvbas Kryvyi Rih players
FC Hoverla Uzhhorod players
FC Vorskla Poltava players
FC Volyn Lutsk players
FC Lviv players
FC Sevastopol players
Górnik Zabrze players
Ekstraklasa players
III liga players
IV liga players
Ukrainian expatriate footballers
Expatriate footballers in Poland
Ukrainian expatriate sportspeople in Poland
Association football defenders
Sportspeople from Kyiv Oblast
Ukrainian football managers
Ukrainian expatriate football managers
Expatriate football managers in Poland